Nondier Humberto Romero Peña (born 22 February 1979) is a Colombian football defender.

Titles

References

1979 births
Living people
Colombian footballers
América de Cali footballers
Deportes Quindío footballers
Once Caldas footballers
Atlético Huila footballers
Águilas Doradas Rionegro players
Jaguares de Córdoba footballers
Orsomarso S.C. footballers
Association football defenders
People from Palmira, Valle del Cauca
Sportspeople from Valle del Cauca Department
21st-century Colombian people